Mitchell-Ward House may refer to:

Mitchell–Ward House (Gentry, Arkansas), listed on the National Register of Historic Places in Benton County
Mitchell–Ward House (Belvidere, North Carolina), listed on the National Register of Historic Places in Perquimans County

See also
Mitchell House (disambiguation)
Ward House (disambiguation)

Architectural disambiguation pages